Chris Connelly (born 11 November 1964) is a Scottish musician and author who became famous for his industrial music work of the late 1980s and early 1990s, particularly his involvement with the Revolting Cocks and Ministry. He has since established himself as an alternative singer-songwriter, and continues to release solo albums, as well as perform on collaborations.

Early years
Connelly was born in Bruntsfield, Scotland to Michael and Sadie (née King) Connelly near the city centre of Edinburgh. Connelly's father died in a swimming accident early in his life, causing Chris to focus on artistic interests outside the home to help fill the void. Connelly's Scottish ancestry includes Irish descent through the Connellys and Murphys, who originally came from Ireland to Scotland. His mother's side, the Kings and the McCullochs, were from the Highlands and migrated to Glasgow in search of work.

Music career
Connelly began his music career in 1980 with the formation of Finitribe. Through subsequent years he fronted or was heavily involved with numerous notable industrial, dance, and new wave acts. In 2008, Connelly published a memoir of his early years in the music industry, Concrete, Bulletproof, Invisible, and Fried: My Life As A Revolting Cock. It describes his professional debut in Finitribe, meeting Al Jourgensen in London, his involvement with the Revolting Cocks, Ministry, PTP, Acid Horse, Murder, Inc., and Pigface, and the development of his solo career.

In contrast to his industrial roots, Connelly explores various genres in his solo works. In 2013, he started two more industrial projects: Cocksure, with Jason C. Novak (Czar, Acumen Nation, and DJ? Acucrack), and Bells into Machines, with Paul Barker (Ministry, Revolting Cocks, and Lard), as well as the resurrection of the Cocks sans Al Jourgensen and with Richard 23 of Front 242 in 2016.

Personal life
Connelly is now based in Chicago and manages Reckless Records, a record store in Wicker Park. He also is a vocal instructor at Oak Park School of Rock.

Band affiliations
 Acid Horse
 Bells Into Machines
 Chris Connelly and The Bells (not to be confused with the 1970s Canadian band The Bells)
 Catherine
 Chainsuck
 Cocksure
 The Damage Manual
 Die Warzau
 Everyoned
 The Final Cut
 Finitribe
 The High Confessions
 The Joy Thieves
 KMFDM
 The Love Interest
 Ministry
 Murder, Inc.
 Pigface
 PTP
 Revolting Cocks
 Sons of the Silent Age (David Bowie tribute band)
 Thanatos
 NUKES

Solo discography
 Whiplash Boychild (1991)
 Phenobarb Bambalam (1992)
 Shipwreck (1994)
 Songs for Swinging Junkies with William Tucker (1994)
 The Ultimate Seaside Companion with The Bells (1997)
 Blonde Exodus with The Bells (2001)
 Largo with Bill Rieflin (2000)
 Private Education (2002)
 Initials C.C., a collection of rarities and Connelly's personal favorites (2002)
 Night of Your Life (2004)
 The Episodes (2007)
 Forgiveness & Exile (2008)
 Pentland Firth Howl (2009)
 How This Ends (2010)
 Artificial Madness (2011)
 Day of Knowledge (2012)
 Decibels From Heart (2015) 
 Art + Gender (2017)
 The Tide stripped Bare (limited release-2018)
  Bloodhounds (limited release-2018)
  Sleeping Partner (2019)
  Graveyard Sex (2020)
  The Birthday Poems (2021)

Guest appearances 

Front Line Assembly - Wake Up the Coma (2019)
Paul Barker - Fix This!!! (2012)
Jarboe - The Men Album (2005)
Catherine - Hot Saki & Bedtime Stories (1996)

Music compilation appearances
"Desperado" on Welcome to Our Nightmare: a Tribute to Alice Cooper (1993)
"A Mutual Friend" on Whore: Various Artists Play Wire (1996)
"Hard Hearted Alice" on Mutations – A Tribute To Alice Cooper (2002)
"What's Left But Solid Gold?" on ...It Just Is (2005)
"Don't Make Me Go" on Cash From Chaos – A Tribute to the Man in Black, Johnny Cash (2005)
"Looking for a River" on Whispers From the Offing (A Tribute to Kevin Coyne) (2007)

Bibliography
Confessions of the Highest Bidder: Poems and Songwords, 1982-1996 (1999) KB Publishing
Concrete, Bulletproof, Invisible and Fried (2007) SAF Publishing
Ed Royal (2010) Shipwrecked Industries

Spoken word
New Town Nocturnes (2016) a collaboration with Michael Begg

References

External links
The official Chris Connelly home page
Interview on Deviant Nation 

British industrial musicians
Living people
Scottish rock singers
20th-century Scottish male singers
Pigface members
Ministry (band) members
1964 births
Revolting Cocks members
Murder, Inc. (band) members
The Damage Manual members
21st-century Scottish male singers
Underground, Inc. artists
Scottish expatriates in the United States